Benjamin Miller Bosworth (January 17, 1848 – February 7, 1899) was a state representative in Rhode Island, and a justice of the Rhode Island Supreme Court from 1897 until his death in 1899.

Born in Warren, Rhode Island, Bosworth served in the Rhode Island House of Representatives from 1880 to 1882, and again from 1885 to 1886. He was a district judge of Rhode Island's 5th District from 1886 to 1897, when he took office as a justice of the Rhode Island Supreme Court. He was confirmed to a newly established seat on the court without opposition on May 18, 1897, and assumed office on June 2, 1897.

In 1888, Bosworth served as a delegate to the Republican National Convention, where he championed the candidacy of William B. Allison.

Personal life and death
On March 17, 1875, he married Mary M. Cole. They had no surviving children. Bosworth had a history of heart disease, and died in his home of a sudden heart attack after returning from a trip to the public library in Warren, where he helped to catalog the books.

References

Justices of the Rhode Island Supreme Court
People from Warren, Rhode Island
Members of the Rhode Island House of Representatives
1848 births
1899 deaths
19th-century American politicians
19th-century American judges